Albert J. Crumeyrolle (1919–1992) was a French mathematician and professor of mathematics at the Paul Sabatier University, known for his contributions to spinor structures and Clifford algebra.

Work 
Crumeyrolle was a student of André Lichnerowicz under whose supervision he completed a thesis in 1961.

His first important paper after completing his doctorate addressed spinor structures using methods of Clifford algebras developed by Claude Chevalley.

Crumeyrolle is known for his major contributions to theories of Clifford algebras and spinor structures. In 1975 he laid the foundations for symplectic Clifford algebra and the symplectic spinor. An earlier publication by two other authors, Nouazé and Revoy, had appeared three years before in which Weyl algebras were treated from a Cliffordian point of view. Crumeyrolle however drew more attention to the topic, and, as emphasized by Jacques Helmstetter, he contributed original ideas of his own. His work on symplectic Clifford algebras however came under serious critique on mathematical grounds.

The mathematician Artibano Micali recalled Crumeyrolle stating that periodicity of Clifford algebras should play a similar role for elementary particle physics as the periodic classification of elements by Dmitri Mendeleev has played for the periodic table of elements.

Crumeyrolle taught in Iran in 1966, in several Europe countries and, in 1973, at Stanford University summer school.

Publications

Books 
 Orthogonal and symplectic Clifford algebras: Spinor Structures, 1990 
 Albert Crumeyrolle & J. Grifone: Symplectic geometry, Pitman Advanced Publishing Program, 1983
 Algèbres de Clifford et spineurs, 1974 
 Bases géométriques de la topologie algébrique, 1970 
 Compléments d'algèbre moderne, 1969 
 Notions fondamentales d'algèbre moderne, 1967

Further reading 
 Rafał Abłamowicz, Pertti Lounesto (eds.): Clifford algebras and spinor structures: a special volume dedicated to the memory of Albert Crumeyrolle (1919–1992), Kluwer Academic Publishers, 1995, 
 Z. Ozievicz, Cz. Sitarczyk: Parallel treatment of Riemannian and symplectic Clifford algebras. In: A. Micali, R. Boudet, J. Helmstetter (eds.): Clifford Algebras and their Applications in Mathematical Physics: Workshop Proceedings: 2nd (Fundamental Theories of Physics), Kluwer Academic Publishers, 1992, p. 83–96

References 

1919 births
1992 deaths
20th-century French mathematicians